Pećišta is a village in the municipality of Srebrenica, Bosnia and Herzegovina.

References

Populated places in Srebrenica